Goleni is a village in Edineț District, Moldova.

Notable people
Maria Piątkowska (1931–2020), Polish athlete

References

Villages of Edineț District